Yusuf Abramjee  is a South African journalist and anti-crime activist. He has won numerous awards for his journalism, and activism, and serves as a social cohesion ambassador for the South African government.

Biography

Early life and education
Yusuf Abramjee was born and grew up in Lady Selborne, an area north west of the Pretoria CBD. Abramjee's father Ebrahim "Boetie" Abramjee later served in the House of Delegates as an MP. Abramjee's family was the last to leave Lady Selborne, in 1984, as a consequence of the Group Areas Act, moving to Laudium, an Indian township in Pretoria.

Abramjee attended Laudium Secondary School, where he edited the school paper, matriculating in 1982, and then studied at the Transvaal College of Education, a teacher's training college Laudium.

Career
After graduating in 1985, Abramjee taught Afrikaans at Laudium Secondary School, before taking a job with the House of Delegates as a spokesman, and then joining the SABC. He later owned and edited a local newspaper, the Laudium Sun.

Abramjee freelanced for Radio 702 ahead of South Africa's first non-racial election in 1994. He joined 702 on a permanent basis as a crime reporter in 1995, becoming crime editor in 1996 for Radio 702 and 567 Cape Talk, another station owned by Primedia. He won several awards for his reporting, and was eventually promoted to station manager of 702, before becoming Primedia's head of news and talk programming. He was chairman of the National Press Club on a few occasions.

Activism

Abramjee was a founder of Crime Line in South Africa, a crime tip-off line, in collaboration with the government. He was a prominent opponent of South Africa's "Secrecy Bill". He helped found LeadSA, which "aims to celebrate efforts of ordinary South Africans to do good". He was reappointed as a social cohesion ambassador by the Arts and Culture Minister in 2019. He also helped coordinate private relief efforts during the Covid-19 pandemic.

Personal life
Abramjee is married, with two adult sons, and lives in Erasmia.

Criticism
Abramjee was accused of self-promotion in 2015 by journalist, and former editor of the Cape Times, Ryland Fisher, who nonetheless described Abramjee as a patriot. Fisher was responding to a controversy involving Abramjee when he penned an open letter to then-president Jacob Zuma, calling for the government to act on the crime problem in South Africa.

Honours, decorations, awards and distinctions

 Order of the Baobab, 2014

References

South African journalists
South African activists
Order of the Baobab
South African Muslim activists
South African people of Indian descent
1960s births
Living people